Microlipophrys is a genus of combtooth blennies found in Atlantic ocean and the Mediterranean Sea.

Species
There are currently seven recognized species in this genus:
 Microlipophrys adriaticus (Steindachner & Kolombatović, 1883) (Adriatic blenny)
 Microlipophrys bauchotae (Wirtz & Bath, 1982)
 Microlipophrys caboverdensis (Wirtz & Bath, 1989)
 Microlipophrys canevae (Vinciguerra, 1880)
 Microlipophrys dalmatinus (Steindachner & Kolombatović, 1883)
 Microlipophrys nigriceps (Vinciguerra, 1883) (Black-headed blenny)
 Microlipophrys velifer (Norman, 1935) (Sailfin blenny)

References

Taxa named by Peter Wirtz
 
Salarinae